Barnstone is an English village in the Rushcliffe borough of Nottinghamshire, forming part of Langar cum Barnstone parish. It lies on the border with Leicestershire. The nearest retail stores, schools and railway station are in Bingham (4.5 miles, 7 km). The spelling in the 19th century was usually "Barnston". The parish church of St Mary's belongs to the Wiverton group, but is not currently in use.

Heritage
The Domesday Book of 1086 states that Barnstone contained 26 households. The Lord at Barnstone and at Langar at the time was William Peverel. In about 1870–1872, Barnstone had a population of 169.

The Manor House in Main Road is a Grade II listed building originating from the 17th century, with 18th and 19th-century additions. So is The Rookery, a large mid-18th-century house now subdivided, and the late 18th-century Roadside Farmhouse and Barn.

Governance
Barnstone forms part of Langar and Barnstone parish in the Borough of Rushcliffe. Since December 1919, the member of Parliament (MP) for the Rushcliffe constituency, to which Barnstone belongs, is the Conservative Ruth Edwards.

Cement works
There is a Blue Circle cement works based in Barnstone. The first lime kiln was erected in 1864. Cement manufacture began on the site in 1885, when the first rotary kiln was installed. Sixteen bottle kilns followed in 1886. Barnstone later specialised in manufacturing cements for the mining industry.

The premises were later owned by Lafarge. Manufacture of cement clinker ceased in May 2006, leaving Barnstone as a specialist cement-grinding and blending operation. In 2013, the company merged with Tarmac to become Lafarge Tarmac Ltd.

Transport
Barnstone is served by Centrebus Route 24 between Bingham and Melton Mowbray, running Monday to Saturday three times a day.

Barnstone railway station served the Great Northern and London and North Western Joint Railway and its successors between Melton Mowbray and Nottingham, from 1879 to 1953. Goods traffic to the limestone sidings continued until 1962.

Amenities
Bingham & District ABC (Amateur Boxing Club) meets in Barnstone. There is also a bowling green, which includes a skate park, and a village hall. Barnstone Railway Cutting is an area of calcareous grassland classed as a site of special scientific interest by Natural England.

See also
Barnstone railway station
St Mary's Church, Barnstone

References

External links

For Pete's Sake. The Peter Taylor Story by Wendy Dickinson and Stafford Hildred (Kibworth Beauchamp: Matador, 2010) Retrieved 18 November 2016. includes a description of Taylor's time as a wartime evacuee in Barnstone.
Barnstone received a sizeable group of child evacuees from Great Yarmouth in 1940. There are photographs of several of them here: Retrieved 18 November 2016.

Villages in Nottinghamshire
Rushcliffe
Cement companies of the United Kingdom